Devika Bhise is an American actress, best known for her performance in The Man Who Knew Infinity, starring Dev Patel and Jeremy Irons.

Early life

Bhise was born and raised in Manhattan, New York City, and is of Indian descent. She attended The Brearley School, an all-girl private school in Manhattan, and Johns Hopkins University, where she won the Hodson Trust Scholarship and was a Woodrow Wilson Fellow under the mentorship of John Astin. While at Johns Hopkins University, she acted in Ira Hauptman's play, The Partition, based on the life of Ramanujan, which contributed to her being cast in the film years later.

Career

Bhise was cast in her first film, The Accidental Husband, directed by Griffin Dunne, in tenth grade. While in high school, she also directed a documentary film Hijras: The Third Gender, which won the award for Best Social Documentary at the New York Independent Film Festival in 2009. After graduating from Johns Hopkins, Bhise was cast in Partial Comfort's Off-Broadway production of And Miles To Go, a play written by Chad Beckim, directed by Hal Brooks. She played small parts in television series such as Elementary and One Bad Choice until she was cast in The Man Who Knew Infinity with Dev Patel and Jeremy Irons. She was seen next as the lead role in The Warrior Queen of Jhansi, the biopic on Indian queen Rani Lakshmibai, acting opposite Derek Jacobi and Rupert Everett. Bhise also co-wrote the script. She also performed in 'Impossible Monsters' which also starred Chris Henry Coffey and Geofrey Owens in 2020 as a university student being part of a study on sleep paralysis.

Social activism

Bhise is part of New York's New Abolitionists, a group of New Yorkers "united by our commitment to ending human trafficking, in New York State and globally", alongside Christie Brinkley, Michael Bloomberg, Tina Fey, Seth Meyers, Lee Daniels, Preet Bharara, Diane von Furstenberg, Gloria Steinem, Meryl Streep, and others.

Personal life
She is the daughter of dancer and director Swati Bhise and Bharat Bhise. In 2020, Bhise married Nicholas Gilson, Founder and CEO of Gilson Snow.

Filmography

Film

Television

References

Living people
1990s births
People from Manhattan
Actresses from New York City
American film actresses
American television actresses
American actresses of Indian descent
21st-century American actresses
Johns Hopkins University alumni
Brearley School alumni
Year of birth missing (living people)